Pala Chourai is a census town in Chhindwara district in the Indian state of Madhya Pradesh.

Demographics
As of the 2001 India census, Pala Chourai had a population of 7264. Males constitute 52% of the population and females 48%. Pala Chourai has an average literacy rate of 72%, higher than the national average of 59.5%: male literacy is 80%, and female literacy is 63%. In Pala Chourai, 10% of the population is under 6 years of age.

References

Cities and towns in Chhindwara district